The Georgina Kincaid series is a collection of six urban fantasy novels written by Richelle Mead. The series is written in a first-person perspective following the main character, Georgina Kincaid, who is a succubus with a heart, who is working at a local book store called Emerald City Books & Cafe.

Books
 Succubus Blues (2007)
 Brushstrokes
 Succubus on Top (2008)
 City of Demons (2016)
 Succubus Dreams (2008)
 Succubus Heat (2009)
 Succubus Shadows (2010)
 Succubus Revealed (2011)

Succubus Blues
Succubus Blues is the first novel in the series. It introduces the character of Georgina Kincaid, an immortal (though still very human) succubus, her coworkers at her human job, and her damned co-workers at her real job. Despite her wholesome and dull position at a Seattle bookstore, Georgina is charged with tempting men to sin so that she can score points for team Hell, and recharge her own personal magical essence. The status quo is upset when her favorite author comes to town for a book signing and immortals around her start inexplicably dying.

Film rights for Succubus Blues have been sold to Fox TV.

Succubus on Top (Succubus Nights in the UK)
Succubus on Top is the second novel in the series.

Succubus Dreams
Succubus Dreams is the third novel in the series.

Succubus Heat
Succubus Heat is the fourth novel in the series. RT Book Reviews found it amusing but said the plot dragged; they awarded 3 stars. It was 4th equal in Publishers Weekly's BHB Reader’s Choice Best Books of 2009.

Succubus Shadows
Succubus Shadows is the fifth novel in the series.

Succubus Revealed
Succubus Revealed is the sixth novel in the series.

City of Demons
City of Demons is a novella in the Georgina Kincaid series. It is found in the anthology Eternal Lover and takes place between the second (On Top) and third (Dreams) titles.

References

External links
 Georgina Kincaid series homepage on Official Richelle Mead website 
 Official Richelle Mead website

Book series introduced in 2007
Novels by Richelle Mead
American novel series
American fantasy novel series
American horror novels
American romance novels
American vampire novels
Dark fantasy novels
Demon novels
Horror novel series
Succubi in popular culture
Urban fantasy novels